Steffen Thum (born 8 June 1988) is a German composer for film, TV, games and advertising, based in Berlin. He is known for his work on feature films Crawl and Looking Up, Netflix Original film iBoy and indie thriller Warning Shot.

His score for the 2020 horror feature film Tribal - Get Out Alive won Best Original Score at the UK Motion Picture Festival.

From 2014 to 2020, Thum worked at Hans Zimmer's studio Remote Control Productions, providing additional music for feature films like Black Widow, Bad Boys For Life and Mission Impossible: Fallout, TV shows like The Crown, His Dark Materials and Genius, as well as video games like Skylanders: Superchargers, among others.

The Film Music Institute listed him among "Best Scores of 2019 - Composers To Watch".

Filmography (selection) 
Composer

 2017: iBoy
2017: Take The Shot (Short Film)
 2018: Warning Shot
 2018: IGNITE
2018: Manipulation (Short)
2019: Crawl
2019: Looking Up
2019: This Is Football
2020: Tribal - Get Out Alive
2021: Room (Short)
2021: Quinceañero (Short)
Further Credits (Additional Music & Arrangement)

 2010: Nydenion
 2015: Terminator: Genisys
 2015: Skylanders: SuperChargers
 2015: Saints & Strangers (TV series)
 2016: 13 Hours: The Secret Soldiers of Benghazi
 2016: Le Mans 3D
 2016: War on Everyone
 2016–2017: The Crown (TV series)
 2016–2020: Marcella (TV series)
 2016–2019: The Story of God with Morgan Freeman (TV series)
 2017: The Lego Batman Movie
 2017: Ghost In The Shell
 2017: Churchill
 2017: Rakka (Short)
 2017: Zygote (Short)
 2017: Genius: Albert Einstein (TV series)
 2017: Transformers: The Last Knight
 2017: Dunkirk (uncredited)
 2017: Geostorm
 2018: Operation: 12 Strong
 2018: Studio 54: The Documentary
 2018: The Hurricane Heist
 2018–2021: Bulletproof (TV series)
 2018: The Investigator: A British Crime Story (TV series)
 2018: Genius: Picasso (TV series)
 2018: Mission Impossible: Fallout
 2018: Driven
 2018: FIFA 19 (Video Game)
 2018: The Cry (TV series)
 2019: Where's My Roy Cohn?
 2019: Georgetown
 2019: Ad Astra
 2019: Gemini Man
 2019: 6 Underground
 2019–2020: His Dark Materials (TV series)
 2020: Bad Boys For Life
 2020: Rebuilding Paradise
 2020: The Reagans (TV series)
 2020: Songbird
 2021: Pennyworth (TV series)
 2021: Black Widow

References

External links 
 
 

German film score composers
Video game composers
Male film score composers
1988 births
Living people